The 2014 Loais Senior Hurling Championship was the 118th staging of the Laois Senior Hurling Championship since its establishment by the Laois County Board in 1888. The championship began on 19 July 2014 and ended on 28 September 2014.
Camross were the defending champions, however, they were defeated by Rathdowney–Errill on a score line of 1-20 to 0-1 in the final.

Teams 

All but one of the eight teams from the 2013 championship participated in the top tier of Laois hurling in 2014.

Portlaoise, who defeated Clough–Ballacolla in the final of the junior championship in 2013, availed of their right to automatic promotion to the senior championship.

Similarly, The Harps defeated Ballinakill in the 2013 senior relegation play-off, and so Ballinakill were relegated to the junior grade for 2014.

Fixtures and results

Round 1

Round 2A

Round 2B

Relegation play-off

Quarter-finals

Semi-finals

Final

External links 

 2014 Laois Senior Hurling Championship

References 

Laois Senior Hurling Championship
Laois Senior Hurling Championship